Mihai Eminescu National College is the name of several schools in Romania:

 Mihai Eminescu National College (Baia Mare), a high school in Baia Mare
 Mihai Eminescu National College (Botoșani), a high school in Botoșani
 Mihai Eminescu National College (Bucharest), a high school in Bucharest
 Mihai Eminescu National College (Buzău), a high school in Buzău
 Mihai Eminescu National College (Constanța), a high school in Constanţa
 Mihai Eminescu National College (Iași), a high school in Iași
 Mihai Eminescu National College (Oradea), a high school in Oradea
 Mihai Eminescu National College (Satu Mare), a high school in Satu Mare
 Mihai Eminescu National College (Suceava), a high school in Suceava